Haralambie Eftimie (born 1 September 1934) is a Romanian former football forward and manager. He played for teams such as Dinamo Bacău, Dinamo București, Știința Craiova and FC Argeș Pitești, also winning two league titles with Dinamo București.

As a manager, Eftimie worked for CS Botoșani, Electroputere Craiova, Dinamo Slatina or Steaua Mecanica Huși, among others, with the latter managing to achieve the highest performances in the club's history.

International career
Haralambie Eftimie played three matches at international level for Romania, including two at the 1960 European Nations' Cup qualifiers.

Honours
Dinamo București
Divizia A: 1961–62, 1962–63

References

External links

1934 births
Living people
Footballers from Bucharest
Romanian footballers
Romania international footballers
Association football forwards
Liga I players
Liga II players
FCM Bacău players
FC Dinamo București players
CS Universitatea Craiova players
FC Argeș Pitești players
Romanian football managers